The Miller Group is a diverse transportation construction company based in Markham, Ontario, Canada where its Corporate Head Office is located. Its U.S. headquarters is located in Morrow, Georgia.

Miller was founded as AE Jupp Construction Company in Toronto, Ontario in 1917 by Albert Ernest Jupp (1883-1945), a former City of Toronto government civil engineer Jupp previously worked for Routly and Summers and formed his company on the dissolution of his former employer.

Miller has diversified into other areas:
 Waste, Recycling & Compost Services
 General Contractor and Construction Services
 Construction Materials Supplier - aggregate, asphalt, concrete, cement, minerals, redi-rock
 pavement products
 public transit contractor
 Road and Highway Maintenance - GTA contractor to Ontario Ministry of Transportation for 400-series highways
 Golf and Recreation

After Jupp's death the company assets were acquired by Don Miller, whom worked for Jupp,  to become Miller Paving Limited in 1946. and then acquired by Leo McArthur in 1953. On February 28, 2018, Colas Canada completed the acquisition of 100% of the shares of the Miller McAsphalt Group.

Units

 Brennan Paving & Construction Limited
 Miller Transit Limited
 Miller Paving Limited 
 Huron Construction Co. Limited 
 Smith Construction 
 Miller Waste Systems 
 Miller Composting Corporation 
 PBS Waste Systems 
 Bloomington Downs Golf Club
 Industrial Cold Milling Limited
 Miller Cement Limited
 Mill-AM Corporation
 Miller Environmental Corporation
 Miller Maintenance Limited
 Miller Minerals
 Miller Northwest Limited
 Miller Paving Northern
 Norway Asphalt Limited
 Pebblestone Multiservices Incorporated
 Smith's Construction Company
 Talon Sebeq Incorporated
 Vicdom Sand and Gravel Limited
 MSO Construction Limited
 McAsphalt Industries Ltd
 MacDonald Paving and Construction Limited
 Cumberland Paving Ltd
 The Murray Group Limited
 Pave-Al Ltd.

Miller Transit
Miller Transit was established in 1984 when it operated buses on behalf of Markham Transit and is now one of the operators of 135 buses for York Region Transit.  The transit operator has a staff of 286 operators. Miller Transit operates York Region Transit Division 1 routes  in Markham and Stouffville. Buses and service fleet are based at 8050 Woodbine Avenue. The Miller Yard is an outdoor facility and home to 135 buses stored on Miller Avenue or Burncrest Road.

Fleet

General 

GMC C-series flat bed truck
 International Truck salt trucks
 International Truck garbage trucks
 International Truck snowplows
 Mack Trucks garbage trucks

Sanitation

Solid waste management 

 Freightliner M2106 / Fanotech rear loading garbage trucks
 Freightliner FL112 / EZ Pack rear loader garbage trucks
 International Workstar / Labrie Top Select side loading garbage trucks
 International Workstar / Labrie Expert 2000 side loading garbage trucks
 International Durastar / Walinga side loading garbage trucks
 Sterling / Universal Handling Equipment rear loading garbage trucks
 Mack MR / McNeilus front end loading garbage trucks
 Mack MR / Universal Handling Equipment front end loading garbage trucks

Snow removal 

 Salt spreaders
 Articulated bucket loaders
 Road graders
 Tow Plows
 Deicing machines

References

External links 

Miller Group
Miller Waste Systems Inc.

Transport in Ontario
Construction and civil engineering companies of Canada
Companies based in Markham, Ontario
Companies based in Clayton County, Georgia
Construction and civil engineering companies established in 1917
1917 establishments in Ontario
Canadian companies established in 1917